Youlan-class cable layer is a class of little known cable layer built in the People’s Republic of China (PRC) for the People's Liberation Army Navy (PLAN), and it has received the NATO reporting name Youlan (邮缆 in Chinese), meaning Postal Cable.

Contrary to the usual layout of Chinese cable layers built earlier of bow sheaves design, Dong-Lan 885 class cable layers adopts modern stern sheaves design. The superstructure consists of three levels of decks, with the first deck for enlisted quarters, clinic, conference room, and control room for cable laying machinery. The second deck is for officers’ quarters, while the third deck is bridge, where navigation, control and communication consoles are located. Dong-Lan 885-class cable layer is equipped with radars, sonars, radios, buoys, tension machines and various other devices to enable it lay and repair both power cable and communication cable, including fiber optic cable. A total of 2 units have been identified by the end of 2021: Dong-Lan 885 was the first ship of this class, and the second ship of this class is PLANS Nan-Lan 233,which replaced the retired Type 991 cable layer unit of the same pennant number/name.

Youlan class in PLAN service is designated by a combination of two Chinese characters followed by a three-digit number, with the second Chinese character is Lan(缆), meaning cable (for communication & power) in Chinese. The first Chinese character denotes which fleet the ship is service with, with East (Dong, 东) for East Sea Fleet (ESF), North (Bei, 北) for North Sea Fleet (NSF), and South (Nan, 南) for South Sea Fleet (SSF). However, the pennant numbers are subject to change due to changes of Chinese naval ships naming convention, or when units are transferred to different fleets. Specification:
Length: 97 meter

Reference

Auxiliary ships of the People's Liberation Army Navy